Esther Lưu (Hangul: 류에스더, Romaja: Ryu Eseudeo) born June 22, 1985, professionally known as Hari Won (Hangul: 하리원), is a South Korean-born Vietnamese singer, actress, and MC in Vietnam.

Life and career
Hari Won was born in Seoul, South Korea. Her father is from Vietnam and her mother is South Korean. Her father came to South Korea in 70s and met her mother there. Their marriage wasn't accepted by her mother's family as her father was not wealthy as well as being of non-Korean descent. However, they still got married, albeit, with some disapproval by her mother's family. As documented by KBS, she had a relatively unhappy childhood due to her mother's family not accepting the marriage at that time, as well as experiencing some discrimination for being from a bicultural family. Her name means, "you will get anything you wish for" in Korean. "Won" in Korean can be transliterated to "Nguyễn" in Vietnamese.

She moved to Vietnam in 2007 since her father fell ill, and has been there ever since. In 2010, she started learning Vietnamese at Ho Chi Minh City University of Social Science and Humanities. She is currently living and working in Ho Chi Minh City, Vietnam. Hari is fluent in Vietnamese, Korean, English and is proficient in Japanese.

Career

She was one of the contestants on Cuộc đua kỳ thú 2013 (the Vietnamese version of The Amazing Race) alongside her then boyfriend - rapper Đinh Tiến Đạt where she began to gain more fame and popularity.

As a singer, she released her debut single Hương Đêm Bay Xa in 2014, and since then, has released more popular song hits such as Anh Cứ Đi Đi, Cuối Cùng Anh Cũng Đến, Without You, Co Chăng Chỉ Là Giấc Mơ, Là Cả Bầu Trời, and more.

She made her acting debut as the female lead in the 2014 Vietnamese film Chàng Trai Năm Ấy, which is one of the most popular films of 2014 in Vietnam. She starred alongside Sơn Tùng M-TP, Hứa Vỹ Văn, Ngô Kiến Huy, and Phạm Quỳnh Anh. She also become a popular MC in many games shows on TV, such as, Giọng Ca Bí Ẩn (Hidden Voices) and Nhanh Như Chớp (Lighting Quiz Vietnam).

Personal life

In January 2016, she confirmed to have broken up with rapper Đinh Tiến Đạt after 9 years of dating. In April 2016, she is confirmed to be in a relationship with well-known Vietnamese actor and comedian Trấn Thành. Tran Thanh's father is of Chinese descent from Guangdong and his mother from Tien Giang province in Vietnam, and is proficient in English, Cantonese, Mandarin, and Vietnamese. The couple married on December 25, 2016 in Ho Chi Minh City.

Songs
Hương Đêm Bay Xa
Hoa Tuyết - Snow Flower
Bụi Phấn
Bài Ca Thịt Nướng
Jingle Bells
Aloha
Mùa Xuân Trở Về (feat. Sơn Ngọc Minh)
Love You Hate You (feat. Đinh Tiến Đạt)
Lovely Active Sexy (feat. Hà Lê)
Honey Honey
Khóc (Korea version)
Hạnh Phúc Mới
Lời Tỏ Tình (feat. Sơn Ngọc Minh)
Cảm Ơn Cha (feat. Hồ Võ Thanh Thảo)
Con Gái Có Quyền Điệu
Anh Cứ Đi Đi
Yêu Không Hối Hận
Làm sao để yêu
Từ giây phút đầu
Cuối cùng anh cũng đến
Without You
Happy Christmas
Có chăng chỉ là giấc mơ
Ảo Mộng Tình Yêu (feat. Đan Trường)
Hoang Phí Xuân Thì (feat. Vương Anh Tú)

Television programs
Chung Sức – Family Feud (2015 Vietnamese version)
T-ara Fan Meeting
Tôi Tỏa Sáng
Hội Ngộ Danh Hài 2015-2017 (each 2 episodes)
Tám Ngàn Won
Ai Cũng Bật Cười
Siêu Bất Ngờ
Nhanh Như Chớp
Là Vợ Phải Thế – Smart Wives (Season 2)
7 Nụ Cười Xuân
Ô Hay Gì Thế Này
BISTRO K - Quán ăn Hạnh Phúc 
Kỳ Tài Thách Đấu
Giọng Ca Bí Ẩn 
Biến Hóa Hoàn Hảo – My Name Is... (Judges)
Quý Ông Đại Chiến
Khi Chàng Vào Bếp
100 Giây Rực Rỡ
Hành Lý Tình Yêu
Sao Hỏa Sao Kim
Siêu Tài Năng Nhí
Chị Em Chúng Mình

References

External links

Hari Won at Facebook
Lật trang hồ sơ về Hari Won, Tiền Phong.
Hari Won, Trường Giang thay Bình Minh làm MC chương trình "Chung sức", Lao Động.

1985 births
Living people
21st-century Vietnamese women singers
Vietnamese film actresses
Singers from Seoul
People from Seoul
South Korean people of Vietnamese descent
South Korean expatriates in Vietnam
Korean-language singers
Vietnamese-language singers
English-language singers from South Korea
21st-century South Korean women singers
The Amazing Race contestants